Barr Smith may refer to:

People 
 Robert Barr Smith (1824–1915), Australian businessman and philanthropist
 Tom Elder Barr Smith (1863–1941), South Australian pastoralist and philanthropist
 Sir Tom Elder Barr Smith (1904–1968), South Australian pastoralist and businessman

Other 
 Barr Smith Library of the University of Adelaide
 Mount Barr Smith, Antarctica, named in 1912 by Douglas Mawson after Robert Barr Smith